David Eldon Fletcher (10 December 1971 – 29 June 2009) was a British musician and Principal Double Bass of the Royal Liverpool Philharmonic Orchestra and guest Principal Bass of the Norwegian National Opera in Oslo.

He worked with the Royal Philharmonic Orchestra, the London Symphony Orchestra, the BBC National Orchestra of Wales and many others. He was also a member of British Psychedelic folk/rock band Colorama. In 2006 he was made a Fellow of the Royal Academy of Music in recognition of his achievements.

On 29 June 2009, just a days after Colorama's appearance at the Glastonbury Festival, Fletcher died suddenly at the age of 37, from a heart attack suffered in his sleep.

The David Fletcher Memorial Fund was launched in October 2010 to provide support for young double bass players on the cusp of their professional careers.

References

External links

musicians union – Tribute to David Fletcher
BBC's musical biography of Colorama
BBC Glastonbury – This page is dedicated to David Fletcher
Encore Magazine Summer 09
The David Fletcher Memorial Fund

British classical double-bassists
Male double-bassists
Rock double-bassists
1971 births
2009 deaths
20th-century classical musicians
20th-century British musicians
20th-century double-bassists
20th-century British male musicians